GSK2881078 is a drug which acts as a selective androgen receptor modulator (SARM). It was developed for the prevention of muscle wasting and sarcopenia in elderly people.

See also 
 Enobosarm
 JNJ-28330835
 Ligandrol

References

External links

Selective androgen receptor modulators